Radcliff Hall may refer to:

People
 Radclyffe Hall (1880–1943), an English poet and author

Buildings
 A fictional school in The Girls of Radcliff Hall, a lesbian roman-a-clef by Lord Berners

See also
 Redcliffe Hall (disambiguation)